Priory Heath Ward is a ward in the South East Area of Ipswich, Suffolk, England. It returns three councillors to Ipswich Borough Council.

It is designated Middle Layer Super Output Area Ipswich 014 by the Office of National Statistics. It is composed of 6 Lower Layer Super Output Areas.

The ward includes:
 Racecourse
 Ipswich Transport Museum
 Ransomes Industrial Estate

Councillors
The following councillors were elected since the boundaries were changed in 2002. Names in brackets indicates that the councillor remained in office without re-election.

Sarah Barker stood down as a councillor with immediate effect on 7th November 2022. If contested a bye election is due to take place on 15 December 2022.

References

Wards of Ipswich
South East Area, Ipswich